The Angerstein Collection comprises 38 paintings that were bought by the British government from the collection of John Julius Angerstein after his death in 1823. They became the first works held by the National Gallery, London, on its foundation in 1824, including the works now catalogued in its collection as NG1, NG2 and NG3, and others up to NG122. They were initially displayed at Angerstein's townhouse at 100 Pall Mall. Other early works acquired by the National Gallery include 16 paintings donated by Sir George Beaumont in 1826, and a bequest of 35 paintings by the Reverend William Holwell Carr by 1831.

The collection includes many Old Masters, including five by Claude Lorrain, four attributed to Annibale Carracci or his cousin Ludovico Carracci or their circle, three by Anthony van Dyck, three after Correggio, two by Titian or his workshop, two by Rembrandt or his workshop, two by Gaspard Dughet, and two by Peter Paul Rubens, as well as single paintings by Aelbert Cuyp, Damiano Mazza, Raphael, Sebastiano del Piombo, and Justus Sustermans, and one after Nicolas Poussin. It also included several more modern paintings: seven works by William Hogarth, including the complete series of six paintings of Marriage A-la-Mode, and one painting each by Joshua Reynolds and David Wilkie.

List of works

References
 The National Gallery; its pictures and their painters. With critical remarks, George Foggo, 1851, pp. 11–26
 The National Gallery: its pictures and their painters. A hand-book for visiters. A catalogue., Henry G. Clarke, 1843, pp. 16–21
 John Julius Angerstein, National Gallery, London
 William Hazlitt's Account of ‘Mr Angerstein's Collection of Pictures’, Tate
 Angerstein collection of pictures, Hansard, House of Commons debates, 2 April 1824, vol. 11 cc. 101–3
 Angerstein family, London Metropolitan Archives
 Watercolour of The National Gallery when at Mr J. J. Angerstein's House, Pall Mall, Victoria and Albert Museum

Art museum collections
National Gallery, London